Ralph Raymond Peña (February 24, 1927, Jarbidge, Nevada - May 20, 1969, Mexico City) was an American jazz double bassist and composer.

Peña learned to play low brass instruments as a child and began playing professionally in the early 1940s, becoming known as a jazz double bassist. In this capacity, in the early 1950s he worked with Charlie Barnet, Stan Getz, Barney Kessel, Billy May, Jack Montrose, Vido Musso, Art Pepper, Duane Tatro, and Cal Tjader. He recorded with Shorty Rogers from 1955 to 1958, appearing with Rogers in the film The Man with the Golden Arm in 1955, and also played with Jimmy Giuffre in 1955 and 1956 and Buddy DeFranco in the late 1950s. He played in a duo with Pete Jolly from 1958 to 1962 and occasionally recorded with Jolly, Giuffre, and Rogers together. In the early 1960s he worked with Ben Webster, Frank Sinatra, George Shearing, Joe Pass, Bud Shank, Dick Grove, Anita O'Day, Ella Fitzgerald, and Nancy Wilson. Late in the 1960s he worked on film soundtracks. In 1969, in Mexico City, where he had been working on a score, Peña was killed as a pedestrian in an automobile accident.

References

American jazz double-bassists
Male double-bassists
Musicians from Nevada
1927 births
1969 deaths
Road incident deaths in Mexico
20th-century double-bassists
20th-century American male musicians
American male jazz musicians